The Buffalo Bulls softball team represents the University at Buffalo in NCAA Division I college softball. The team participates in the East Division of the Mid-American Conference (MAC). The team plays its home games at Nan Harvey Field located on the university's campus.

History
The University at Buffalo softball program was established in 1979, originally competing at the Division III level. The University discontinued the program in 1987. On November 3, 1998, the University announced the reinstatement of the softball program, as mandated by the Mid-American Conference. Marie Curran was named head coach on May 6, 1999. The Bulls opened their first Division I softball season on March 3, 2000, as an Independent school, sweeping St. Michael's College in Orlando, Florida. In 2001, the Bulls became a full-fledged member of the MAC. Marie Curran was relieved of her duties after nine seasons, and was replaced by Jennifer Teague on July 15, 2008. Teague coached the team for five seasons before being relieved of her duties on May 30, 2013. On July 12 of the same year, Buffalo named former LSU All-American Trena Peel as their new head coach.

No-hitters
The following five no-hitters have been thrown by Buffalo pitchers over the program's history.

May 8, 2004.  Stacey Evans at Toledo (won 1–0)
April 14, 2010.  Terese Diaz vs St. Bonaventure (won 7–0)
April 5, 2014.  Tori Speckman at Ohio (won 4–0)
May 3, 2014.  Tori Speckman at Kent State (won 9–0, 5 innings)
March 23, 2018.  Ally Power vs Eastern Michigan (won 9–1, 5 innings)

Year-by-year results

See also
List of NCAA Division I softball programs

References

External links